Mala Divytsia is an urban-type settlement in Pryluky Raion, Chernihiv Oblast, Ukraine. It hosts the administration of Mala Divytsia settlement hromada, one of the hromadas of Ukraine. Population: 

Mala Divytsia is located on the banks of the Halka River, a left tributary of the Uday, close to its mouth.

Economy

Transportation
Halka railway station on the line connecting Nizhyn and Pryluky is located in Mala Divytsia. There is some passenger traffic.

Mala Divytsia is next to P-67 road connecting Nizhyn and Pyriatyn via Pryluky. It also have access to H07 highway which connects Kyiv and Sumy.

References

Priluksky Uyezd
Urban-type settlements in Pryluky Raion